Ceremony for the 26th Hong Kong Film Awards was held on 15 April 2007 in the Hong Kong Cultural Centre and hosted by Bowie Tsang, Nick Cheung and Lam Chi-chung. Twenty-six winners in nineteen categories were unveiled, with film After This Our Exile being the year's biggest winner. The ceremony also featured performances by Jay Chou, Eason Chan, Alive and Jane Zhang.

The nominees were announced on 1 February 2007. Over a hundred nominees contested for seventeen categories of awards. The front runners were Curse of the Golden Flower and After This Our Exile, with fourteen and ten nominations respectively.

Awards
Below is a complete list of winners and nominees for the 26th Hong Kong Film Awards, which includes twenty-six winners and over a hundred nominees in nineteen categories. Besides the regular categories, two special awards were given out this year, namely the Century Achievement Award (to Run Run Shaw) and the Professional Achievement Award (to Man Yun Ling). The year's biggest winner turned out to be After This Our Exile, which won three major awards in Best Film, Best Director, and Best Screenplay. Its young actor Ian Iskandar also clinched the win for Best Supporting Actor and Best New Performer.

In the Best Asian Film category, nominee Still Life (China) was withdrawn as it failed to meet the election criteria, which stipulate that nominees for the category must be released by means of 35 mm film. The vacancy was filled by I Not Stupid Too (Singapore).

Winners are listed first, highlighted in boldface, and indicated with a double dagger.

The Century Achievement Award was an award presented at the 26th Hong Kong Film Awards to entertainment mogul Sir Run Run Shaw for his 80 years of contributions to the film industry.

References

External links
 Official website of the Hong Kong Film Awards

2007
2006 film awards
2007 in Hong Kong
Hong